Jan van der Horst (born 15 December 1942) is a retired Dutch road cyclist who was active between 1964 and 1973. In 1966 he won the Olympia's Tour, Circuit de Lorraine and a national road title.

References

1942 births
Living people
Dutch male cyclists
Sportspeople from Haarlem
Cyclists from North Holland
20th-century Dutch people